Mary Balogh (born Mary Jenkins on 24 March 1944) is a Welsh-Canadian novelist writing historical romance, born and raised in Swansea. In 1967, she moved to Canada to start a teaching career, married a local coroner and settled in Kipling, Saskatchewan, where she eventually became a school principal. Her debut novel appeared in 1985. Her historical fiction is set in the Regency era (1811–1820) or the wider Georgian era (1714–1830).

Biography

Personal life
Mary Jenkins was born and raised in Swansea, Wales, daughter of Mildred Double, a homemaker, and Arthur Jenkins, a signwriter and painter. She moved to Canada on a two-year teaching contract in 1967 after leaving university. There, she met and married her Canadian husband Robert Balogh, a coroner and ambulance driver, and settled in the small prairie town of Kipling, Saskatchewan. She taught high-school English for a number of years, and rose to the level of school principal. She has three children and five grandchildren.

Writing career
As an adult, Balogh discovered the world of the Regency romance as written by Georgette Heyer. The vast majority of Balogh's novels have been set in Regency or Georgian England or Wales. Although she writes historical romances, Mary Balogh's heroines are often not "ladies". Some are courtesans, illegitimate, "fallen" or "ruined" women. All enjoy passion, and often a marriage and/or a sensual connection precedes recognition of love.

Balogh began her writing career in 1983, when she wrote her first novel A Masked Deception in the evenings at the kitchen table while home and family functioned around her. A Masked Deception was accepted by Signet and published in 1985. Mary Balogh won the Romantic Times Award for best new Regency writer in that year. She is the author of more than 60 published novels and over 30 novellas, and has met with critical success.

Reception
Balogh has received numerous awards, including a Romantic Times Career Achievement Award for Regency Short Stories in 1993 and has appeared on The New York Times Best Seller list.

Bibliography

*Reprinted in the 2003 anthology Under The Mistletoe with one new Mary Balogh novella A Family Christmas
**Reprinted in the 2015 anthology "Christmas Gifts" – e-book only
***Reprinted in the 2015 anthology "Christmas Miracles" – e-book only

References and sources

External links
Official Mary Balogh site
Mary Balogh in Fantastic Fiction

1944 births
20th-century Canadian educators
20th-century Welsh educators
20th-century women educators
20th-century Canadian novelists
20th-century Welsh novelists
21st-century Welsh novelists
21st-century Canadian novelists
20th-century Canadian women writers
21st-century Canadian women writers
20th-century Welsh women writers
21st-century Welsh women writers
21st-century Welsh writers
People from Swansea
Welsh women novelists
Canadian women novelists
Welsh historical novelists
Welsh romantic fiction writers
Canadian romantic fiction writers
Writers of historical romances
Welsh emigrants to Canada
Living people
Writers from Saskatchewan
Writers of historical fiction set in the early modern period